Francis Joseph Reitz High School (FJ Reitz High School, FJ Reitz, or simply Reitz) is a public high school on the west side of Evansville, Indiana. It was founded in 1918 following a donation from local philanthropist and banker Francis Joseph Reitz, for whom the school is named. It is the second-oldest high school in the city after Evansville Central High School and is run by the Evansville Vanderburgh School Corporation. 

It is known as Evansville Reitz by the Indiana High School Athletic Association to distinguish it from Reitz Memorial High School, also named in FJ Reitz's honor. Memorial is a private Roman Catholic school operated by the Diocese of Evansville.

History

Early history and namesake 
In the early 1900s, the only high school in the city was Evansville High School, which was located downtown. This was problematic for the city's west side residents, as it was too far away to be financially practical. The school board agreed to purchase land on the west side on Forest Hill, then also known as Coal Mine Hill and today known as Reitz Hill. However, economic issues stemming from World War I made the project impractical. Before the project was abandoned, local banker Francis Joseph Reitz generously agreed to fund the entire issue through the sale of bonds.

Beginnings 
The cornerstone was laid on November 3, 1917, with the ceremony being presided over by mayor Benjamin Bosse. The original two-story and basement building was opened in September 1918. Evansville High School was renamed Evansville Central to reflect the opening of the new school. Reitz graduated its first senior glass in 1921. That same year, the 10,000-seat (now 12,000-seat) Reitz Football Stadium (locally known as the Reitz Bowl) was completed on the side of a natural slope next to the school.

Expansions 
In 1926 the school was expanded for the first time, with a four-story classroom building and gymnasium being added in the style of the original building to its west end. In 1956 a new section containing many new specialty rooms was added which destroyed its original entrance, and in 1957 a five-story classroom wing and a larger gymnasium were added. Also in 1957, an auditorium was added that connected to the Reitz Bowl press box, creating a tunnel (known simply as "the tunnel" by students) where concessions are sold during home athletic events. In 1973 a greenhouse was added, as well as an electric scoreboard for the Reitz Bowl that was donated by the West Side Nut Club. In 1977 an automobile driving range was added off-campus at the nearby Barker Avenue Sports Complex to accommodate the Indiana Driver's Education Department; the driving range is now the practice lot for the school's marching band. In 1988 a fieldhouse was added along with weight training facilities. In 1998 another building (the "new building" as it is called by the students) was added to the school; it is connected to the old building via an elevated passageway known as "the link" that now serves as the school's main entrance. At the same time, the school received a $26 million renovation. In 2009 the football field was replaced with AstroTurf and dedicated the Herman Byers field, Reitz's head football coach from 1942–1962 who accumulated a 189–51–15 record and 6 state championships.

School colors 
The school's original colors were purple and gold. They were changed to navy and gray in 1926 when the school's football jerseys were received in navy and gray. Following a student vote they become the official colors. It is often incorrectly assumed that the colors were given to Lincoln Elementary School (an African-American school at the time) and changed to navy and gray as the school sits on the Mason–Dixon line, the traditional boundary between slave states and free states.

Academics
13 AP courses are offered at Reitz.

Demographics
The demographic breakdown of the 1,299 students enrolled in 20152016 was:
Male - 49.7%
Female - 50.3%
Native American/Alaskan - >0.1%
Asian/Pacific islanders - 1.3%
Black - 4.2%
Hispanic - 1.5%
White - 87.3%
Multiracial - 5.7%

40.3% of the students were eligible for free or reduced-cost lunch.  FJ Reitz was a Title I school in 20152016.

Sports

Reitz Panthers compete in the Southern Indiana Athletic Conference.  The school colors are navy and gray. The school's fight song, RHS Boys/Girls, is sung to the tune of On, Wisconsin! "Mighty Panthers" is another popular school song and is played following RHS Boys/Girls by the band. The following IHSAA sanctioned sports are offered:

Baseball (boys')
Basketball (boys' and girls')
Girls' state champion - 1981
Cross country (boys' and girls')
Football (boys')
State champions - 2007, 2009
Golf (boys' and girls')
Soccer (boys & girls)
Softball (girls)
Swimming (boys' and girls')
Tennis (boys' and girls')
Track (boys' and girls')
Volleyball (girls')
Wrestling (boys')

Feeder schools
 Perry Heights Middle School
Daniel Wertz Elementary School
West Terrace Elementary School
 Helfrich Park STEM Academy
Cynthia Heights Elementary School
Tekoppel Elementary School

Notable alumni and faculty
 Matthew Alan, actor
 Jay Buente, baseball player, pitched for the Purdue University Boilermakers, the Florida Marlins and the Tampa Bay Rays
 Rudy Charles, Total Nonstop Action Wrestling senior referee
 Brian Claybourn, former American football punter and placekicker at Western Kentucky University, and later a player with the Winnipeg Blue Bombers of the Canadian Football League
 Bob Hamilton, professional golfer; 1944 PGA Championship winner
 Don Hansen, played football at Illinois and for 11 seasons in the NFL
 Lilly King, swimmer, gold medalist at 2016 Summer Olympics
 Khristian Lander, Indiana Hoosiers men's basketball and Western Kentucky Hilltoppers men's basketball player
 Paul Musgrave, expert in American foreign policy matters
 Dru Smith, former Evansville Purple Aces men's basketball and Missouri Tigers men's basketball player, current Miami Heat player.
 Matt Williams, producer of The Cosby Show, Home Improvement, and Roseanne

See also
 List of high schools in Indiana

References

External links
 

High schools in Southwestern Indiana
Schools in Evansville, Indiana
Public high schools in Indiana
Southern Indiana Athletic Conference
Educational institutions established in 1918
1918 establishments in Indiana